Stay in Love is an album by Minnie Ripperton

"Stay in Love", song from Stay in Love
"Stay in Love", song by Hilary Duff from Breathe In. Breathe Out.
"Stay in Love", song by Sam Sparro
"Stay in Love", song by Uppermost from Origins (2011-2016)

See also
I Stay in Love